Pompée Valentin Vastey (1781 - 1820), or Pompée Valentin, Baron de Vastey, was a Haitian writer, educator, and politician. Vastey was what people at the time called a "mulatto," because he was born to a white French father and a black Haitian mother. He served as secretary to King Henri Christophe and tutor to Christophe's son, Victor Henri. Vastey also claimed to have fought in Toussaint's army and is said to have been the second cousin of the French novelist and playwright Alexandre Dumas (Daut 56; see also, Griggs 181). Vastey is best known for his essays on the history and contemporary circumstances of Haiti.

Selected works 

 Le Système Colonial Dévoilé (1814)
  Notes à M. le Baron de V. P. Malouet... en réfutation du 4ème volume de son ouvrage, intitulé: Collection de mémoires sur les colonies, et particulièrement sur Saint-Domingue (1814) 
 Le Cri de la Patrie, ou Les intérêts de tous les Haytiens (1815)
 Le Cri de la Conscience, ou Réponse à un écrit, imprimé au Port-au-Prince, intitulé: Le peuple de la République d’Hayti, à Messieurs Vastey et Limonade (1815)
 Réflexions adressées aux Haïtiens de partie de l'Ouest et du Sud sur l’horrible assassinat du Général Delvare... (1816)
 Réflexions sur une lettre de Mazères : ex-colon français, adressée à M. J.C.L. Sismonde de Sismondi, sur les noirs et les blancs, la civilisation de l'Afrique, le royaume d'Hayti, etc. (English: Reflexions on the Blacks and Whites: Remarks upon a Letter Addressed by M. Mazères, a French Ex-Colonist, to J. C. L. Sismonde de Sismondi), (1816)
 Réflexions Politiques sur quelques Ouvrages et Journaux Français Concernant Haïti (English: Political Remarks upon Certain French Publications and Journals Concerning Haiti), 1817
 Essai sur les Causes de la Révolution et des Guerres Civiles en Haïti (English: An Essay on the Causes of the Revolution and Civil Wars of Haiti), 1819

Notes

Bibliography
 Quevilly, Laurent. Le Baron de Vastey, (Books on Demand, 2014, .) Présentation en ligne= http://www.bod.fr/index.php?id=1786&objk_id=1236505.
 Chris Bongie, The colonial system unveiled, édition critique du Système colonial dévoilé traduit en anglais, Liverpool University Press, 2014. 
 
 Griggs, Earl Leslie and Thomas Prator. Henry Christophe and Thomas Clarkson: A Correspondence (Berkeley : U of California P, 1952). 
 Bongie, Chris. “‘Monotonies of History’: Baron de Vastey and the Mulatto Legend of Derek Walcott's The Haitian Trilogy.” Yale French Studies 107 (2005): 70-107.
 Daut, Marlene. "Un-Silencing the past: Boisrond-Tonnerre, Vastey, and the Re-Writing of the Haitian Revolution." South Atlantic Review 74.1 (2009): 35–64.
Daut, Marlene. Baron de Vastey and the Origins of Black Atlantic Humanism. Basingstoke, UK: Palgrave Macmillan, 2017.

1781 births
1820 deaths
Haitian educators
Haitian essayists
male essayists
Haitian male writers
Haitian people of French descent
Haitian people of Mulatto descent
Haitian politicians